ICFAI University, Tripura is a private university located at Agartala, Tripura, India. It was established in 2004 through an Act of State Legislature (Tripura Act 8 of 2004).

Affiliations
ICFAI University, Tripura is recognised by the University Grants Commission (UGC). The courses of the ICFAI Law College are approved by the Bar Council of India (BCI). The university is a member of the Association of Commonwealth Universities (ACU) and the Association of Indian Universities (AIU) and also Accredited by NATIONAL ASSESSMENT AND ACCREDITATION COUNCIL (NAAC)

References 

Universities in Tripura
Educational institutions established in 2004
2004 establishments in Tripura
Private universities in India